Didier van der Hove (born December 13, 1966)  is a Belgian-Colombian actor.

Early life 
Didier van der Hove was born in Brussels, Belgium and moved to Colombia when he was 10 years old.

Career 
He is a telenovela actor recognized in Spain and throughout Latin America.

His popularity soared after best-selling novels such as El Zorro: La Espada y la Rosa, La tormenta and Pasion de Gavilanes .

In 2008 he became embroiled in a scandal when it was reported in Chile by the staff of the hotel where he stayed, for having sex with his partner, a minor. Chilean law has not matched the age of sexual consent, which remains at 18, while is 14.

Filmography

Telenovelas 
 2014 - El Capo ....Pavel Asimov  
 2014 - El corazón del océano ....Francisco Becerra  
 2014 - La ronca de oro ....Mauro Guerra 
 2013 - La Madame ....Diego 
 2013 - Mamá También ....Pablo 
 2012 - "La prepago"...Patrick Mackensie 
 2011 - Los Herederos Del Monte ... Eulterio
 2010 - El Clon ....Roberto Del Valle
 2009 - Bella Calamidades ....Javier Canal
 2009 - Niños Ricos, Pobres Padres ....Cesar Alarcón
 2008 - Sin senos no hay paraíso ....Alberto Quiroga
 2008 - Doña Bárbara ....Padre de Bárbara villain
 2007 - Zorro: La Espada y la Rosa ....Santiago Michelena villain
 2006 - Amores de mercado ....Roberto Gutiérrez
 2005 - La Tormenta ....Enrique Montalvo villain
 2004 - La mujer en el espejo ....Det. Javier Rosales
 2004 - Te Voy a Enseñar a Querer ....Rodrigo Rodríguez
 2004 - Luna, la heredera ....Erick
 2003 - Pasión de gavilanes ....Flavio Montaño

Series 

 2005 - Decisiones
 2020 - ''NFL Rush Zone: Mundo de Guardianos Como "RZ"

References

Colombian male telenovela actors
Colombian male television actors
Belgian gay actors
1966 births
Living people
Belgian emigrants to Colombia
21st-century LGBT people